C.R. Patil (Chandrakant Raghunath Patil, sometimes his last name is spelt Paatil) is a member of the 17th Lok Sabha of India, elected from Navsari in Gujarat. In 2020 CR Patil was appointed as a new BJP Gujarat chief and he is still in this position.  In 2019, he won election with a record margin of  votes.  In 2014, won election with a record margin of 5,58,116 votes- the 3rd highest of votes across entire India.

He is India's first Member of Parliament to obtain an ISO certification 9001: 2015 for office. The ISO certificate was issued for his office for quality management system applicable for monitoring and administration of the government services for the constituency.

He has played a pivotal role in the development of Surat. Be it policy making for Textiles and Diamond industries or Infrastructure development in Surat or development of Surat airport into a fully functioning one with multiple flights giving air connectivity to Surat with the rest of India and also initiation of International flights from Surat.

Education and background
Patil was born in Jalgaon, Maharashtra. He received post-school technical training at ITI, Surat.

Controversy 
During the second wave of COVID-19, under his leadership, he initiated Covid Care Centres across Gujarat which were set up by various BJP Karyakartas.

The severe scarcity of Remdesivir injection, recommended for use in mild infections. BJP's Gujarat president C.R. Patil ensured procurement of these injections directly from the Pharma company and ensured free distribution of the same to the poor and needy. However, this matter was taken up by leader of opposition with the court on the grounds that distribution of medical injections without Pharma license should not have been done. This matter is sub-judice.

After he joined the Surat police in 1975 as a constable, he first courted trouble after a liquor hoard was recovered from a bootlegger's house in Palsana taluka in 1978 and his name cropped up in the police records as one of those involved.

The same year, another prohibition case was registered against him at the Songadh police station. Patil was arrested by the Surat police Task Force and was finally suspended for six years from the job. In 2009, Mr. Patil’s son, Jignesh was arrested in Surat for consumption of alcohol which is prohibited under the state laws. He was later released on bail.

In 2002, the Crime Branch arrested Patil as the chief defaulter in the Diamond Jubilee Cooperative Bank scam. Patil had taken a loan of more than Rs 54 crore from the cooperative bank and did not repay the amount causing the bank to be suspended from the clearing house in 2002. He was to remain in jail for 15 months,until he secured bail from the Gujarat High Court on the condition that he would repay the dues. He did not,and was re- arrested. He eventually coughed up the money: Rs 88 crore towards the bank loan and the rest for the GIDC land lease cost, with interest.

See also

 Gandeva, Navsari's first 'smokeless' village
 List of members of the 15th Lok Sabha of India
 Politics of India
 Parliament of India
 Government of India
 Gujarat Legislative Assembly

References 

 3.
http://archive.indianexpress.com/news/c-r-patil-tainted-cop-bank-defaulter-and-now-mp-/437236/ C R Patil: tainted cop, bank defaulter, and now MP?

4.
http://archive.indianexpress.com/news/mp-s-son-caught-drinking-at-public-place/502761/

India MPs 2009–2014
Living people
1955 births
Bharatiya Janata Party politicians from Gujarat
People from Navsari district
People from Jalgaon district
Lok Sabha members from Gujarat
India MPs 2014–2019
India MPs 2019–present